Geoffrey Lewis Blake (born August 20, 1962) is an American film and television actor.  Geoffrey Blake is an Emmy nominated, two-time SAG Award-winning actor best known for his role as 'Wesley' (the abusive radical boyfriend) opposite Robin Wright's 'Jenny' in the iconic Academy Award Best Picture Forrest Gump (1994). In addition to Forrest Gump (1994), Blake has appeared alongside Academy Award Winner Tom Hanks in multiple films. Those performances are part of Blake's frequent collaborations with such Academy Award-winning filmmakers as Robert Zemeckis and Ron Howard (Forrest Gump (1994), Contact (1997), Cast Away (2000), Apollo 13 (1995), Edtv (1999), Frost/Nixon (2008)) whose films alone have garnered over $2,000,000,000 in Box office. Blake's most critically acclaimed performance was that of the preppy pipe-smoking astrophysicist 'Fisher', the right-hand man, in the Sci-Fi classic Contact opposite Academy Award winner Jodie Foster.

Early life 

Blake was born in Baltimore, Maryland, the son of Marjorie Myers (née Lewis) and Avery Felton Blake. Blake's film credits include Contact, Young Guns, Forrest Gump and Cast Away. He also voiced a character in FernGully: The Last Rainforest.

Blake graduated from San Ramon Valley High School, Danville, California. He starred in Oklahoma! in high school.

He had recurring roles in the television series Renegade, Paper Dolls, Homefront and Any Day Now. His notable television guest-starring roles include playing Arjin in the Star Trek: Deep Space Nine episode "Playing God", Strife in the Charmed episode "Apocalypse Not", and Dominic in the House episode "Lines in the Sand". In 2012, Blake appeared in the Criminal Minds episode "Closing Time", as an unsub who castrated his victims.

Blake is a graduate of the University of Southern California and a member of the Sigma Nu.

In 2010, he guest starred in the In Plain Sight episode "Whistle Stop", as an informant of the FBI to enter WitSec.

Filmography

Film

Television

Video games

References

External links 
 

1962 births
Living people
Male actors from Baltimore
American male voice actors
American male video game actors
American male film actors
American male television actors
University of Southern California alumni